Virginia is a Germanic and Romance feminine given name derived from the Ancient Roman family name Verginius or Virginius, a name widely assumed to derive from the Latin word virgo, meaning "maiden" or "virgin." According to legend, Virginia was a Roman girl who was killed by her father in order to save her from seduction by the corrupt government official Appius Claudius Crassus.

The name was the 34th most common name for American women and girls, according to the census of 1990. It was the 545th most popular name given to baby girls born in the United States in 2007.

Virginia Dare was the first child born to English parents in North America. Virginia O'Hanlon wrote a letter that prompted the famous "Yes, Virginia, there is a Santa Claus" editorial in the September 21, 1897 edition of the New York Sun. The most famous Virginia is probably the English modernist author Virginia Woolf.

Variants
Virgy (English)
Virgee (English)
Virgie (English)
Virginia (Italian/Spanish)
Virgínia (Portuguese)
Virginie (French)
Virginija (Lithuanian)
Wilikinia (Hawaiian)
Vegenia (Hawaiian)
Βιργινία (Virginia or Viryinia) (Greek)
Virdžinija (Вирџинија) (Serbian language)

Reduced forms/nicknames
Ginnie (English) (see Ginny)
Ginna (English)
Ginger (English)
Ivy (English)
Nia (English)
Nini (English)
Ginny (English)
Jenna (English)
Jinny (English)
Ginia (Spanish)
Gina (Spanish/Portuguese)
Ginata (Spanish)
Gigi (French)
Ginni (Indian)
Vera (English)
Vivi (French)
Vi (French)
Virgi (Italian)
Vina (English)
Nina (English)
Gia (English)
Dingle (English)

Notable people
Virginia Centurione Bracelli, Roman Catholic saint
Virginia Apgar, American obstetrical anesthesiologist, and inventor of the Apgar score
Virginia Bourbon del Monte, an Italian aristocrat
Virginia Coffey, American civil rights activist
Virginia Frazer Boyle, American poet and writer
Virginia Crosbie, British politician
Virginia Mary Crawford (1862–1948), British Catholic suffragist, feminist, journalist, and author
Virginia Clinton, mother of former United States President Bill Clinton
Virginia Dare, the first child born to English parents in the Americas
Virginia Eriksdotter, Swedish noble
Princess Virginia von Fürstenberg, Italian fashion designer and artist
Virginia Hall, American World War II spy
Virginia Hamilton (1936–2002), American author
Virginia Hampson (born 2002), English singer
Virginia Kravarioti, Greek sailor
Virginia Lesser, American statistician
Virginia Madsen, American actress
Virginia Mauret (died 1983), American musician and dancer
Virginia McKenna, British actress and author
Virginia McLaurin (1909–2022), American activist and supercentenarian, who enlightened the Obamas during Black History month 2016
Virginia Miller, several people
Virginia Nyambura (born 1993), Kenyan steeplechase runner
Virginia Ridley, a woman who was imprisoned by her husband 
Virginia Satir, American author and psychotherapist
Virginia Shehee, Louisiana businesswoman and former state senator
Virginia Thomas, January 6 insurrectionist, wife of Clarence Thomas
Virginia Thrasher, American sports shooter and Olympic gold medalist
Virginia Tonelli (1903–1944), Italian partisan
Virginia Wade (born 1945), British tennis player and three-time Grand Slam winner
Virginia Walker (1916–1946), American film actress
Virginia Woolf (1882–1941), English novelist and essayist
Virginia Euwer Wolff, American author
Virginia Zakian, American scientist and professor at Princeton University
Virginia Zeani, Romanian-born opera singer
Virginia “Geena” Davis (born 1956), American actress and activist
Virginia “Ginger” Rogers (1911–1995), American actress

Fictional people
Virginia "Pepper" Potts, fictional character in Marvel Comics

Notes

See also

Feminine given names
English feminine given names
English-language feminine given names
Spanish feminine given names
Italian feminine given names
Romanian feminine given names